Day out of days may refer to:

 Day out of Days (filmmaking), a chart used to tally days worked by cast members
 Day Out of Days (film), a 2015 drama film
 Day Out of Days (book), a collection of stories by Sam Shepard